Paprotno may refer to the following places:
Paprotno, Masovian Voivodeship (east-central Poland)
Paprotno, Drawsko County in West Pomeranian Voivodeship (north-west Poland)
Paprotno, Gryfice County in West Pomeranian Voivodeship (north-west Poland)
Paprotno, Koszalin County in West Pomeranian Voivodeship (north-west Poland)